Rhoiptelea is a monotypic genus of flowering plants in the family Juglandaceae. It contains a single species, Rhoiptelea chiliantha, commonly known as the horsetail tree. This genus was previously recognized in its own family, Rhoipteleaceae, but the APG III system of 2009 placed it in the Juglandaceae family. Rhoiptelea chiliantha is native to southwest China and north Vietnam and lives at the elevation of 700-1600m in mountainous areas. The trees are wind-pollinated, the flowers arranged in large sagged panicles usually 32 cm long like horse tails, and the fruit is a small botanical nut with rounded wings. The leaves are pinnately compound and papery.  The trees are usually 17 m high and with 40 cm diameter. It is a protected species of China.

References

Juglandaceae
Monotypic Fagales genera
Trees of China
Trees of Vietnam
Vulnerable plants
Taxa named by Heinrich von Handel-Mazzetti
Taxa named by Ludwig Diels